The Olympia Theatre (1514–16 Broadway at 44th Street), also known as Hammerstein's Olympia, was a theatre complex built by impresario Oscar Hammerstein I in Longacre Square (later Times Square), New York City, opening in 1895. It consisted of a theatre, a music hall, a concert hall, and a roof garden. Later, sections of the structure were substantially remodeled and used for both live theatre and for motion pictures. As a cinema, it was also known at various times as the Vitagraph Theatre and the Criterion Theatre.

History
It was made from Indiana limestone, featured an imposing façade, and followed French Renaissance designs. It was designed by J. B. McElfatrick & Son. The building opened on November 25, 1895 with the Broadway debut of Excelsior, Jr., with over 30 performers from Europe appearing. It was the second theatre to open in what is now known as the Theater District. (The first was the Empire Theatre, on the southeast corner of 40th Street and Broadway.) The complex consisted of the Music Hall, a large variety theatre, the Lyric, a legitimate theatre, the Concert Hall, for smaller music performances, and a rooftop garden theatre.

In 1898, Hammerstein was forced to sell the complex to settle debts from its construction. The venues were sold separately, with the Music Hall becoming the New York Theatre, which became part of the Loew's movie theatre chain in 1915. The Lyric was renamed the Criterion Theatre. From 1914 to 1916 it operated as the Vitagraph Theatre, leased by the Vitagraph Company for prestige motion pictures including The Battle Cry of Peace, before returning to the Criterion name. It permanently switched to cinema use in 1920. The rooftop garden theatre was leased by Florenz Ziegfeld and hosted the first five editions of the Ziegfeld Follies under the name Jardin de Paris, named for the location in Paris of the Moulin Rouge. It, too, became a movie theatre. The complex was demolished in 1935.

Subsequent site use

After the old venues were demolished, architects Thomas W. Lamb and Eugene DeRosa designed a new building on the site which included a new Criterion Theatre cinema, the International Casino nightclub, and retail space. The nightclub closed after only two years, and the space became the Bond Suits store until 1977. It was then reconverted to a discotheque, Bond International Casino, which closed in 1986. The cinema was multiplexed in 1980.

In 1988, a portion of the former nightclub space was converted was to a pair of live theatre spaces called the Criterion Center. In 1991, the spaces were leased to Roundabout Theatre Company, a prominent non-profit theatre company, which used the larger Stage Right space as a small Tony Award-eligible theatre while the smaller second theatre became the first version of the Laura Pels Theatre. Notable productions during Roundabout's tenure at the Criterion include the 1993 revival of Eugene O'Neill's Anna Christie (featuring Liam Neeson and Natasha Richardson in their Broadway debuts), the 1995 revival of Stephen Sondheim's Company, and the 1997 revival of 1776. The company left the space in 1999 when their lease was canceled.

In the early 2000s, Toys "R" Us built a flagship store in the building, leading to the closure of both the cinema and the live theatre venues. The multilevel store featured a 60-foot in-store Ferris Wheel and an animatronic T-rex among its attractions. Upon expiration of its lease, Toys "R" Us closed on December 30, 2015. The decision was attributed primarily to a rise in property values in Times Square that would increase its rent from $12 million to upwards of $42 million a year. In June 2015, Gap Inc. signed a lease for the property and expected to open stores for its Gap and Old Navy brands in 2017. The two stores account for 62,000 square feet of the 100,000-square-foot store. In July 2016, during the construction of the Gap and Old Navy flagship store, remnants of the original Olympia were found under the floors. The building, known officially as the Bow Tie Building, remains owned by Bow Tie Partners, the real estate holding company tied to Bow Tie Cinemas, the chain operated by the Moss family.

References

External links

 CinemaTreasures.org entry for Criterion Theatre (single screen), New York
 CinemaTreasures.org entry Loew's Criterion Theatre (multiplex), New York
Olympia Theatre: Music Hall at the IBDB database
Criterion Center Stage Right at the IBDB database

1895 establishments in New York City
1935 disestablishments in New York (state)
Theatres completed in 1895
Event venues established in 1895
Buildings and structures demolished in 1935
Former theatres in Manhattan
Times Square buildings
Loew's Theatres buildings and structures
Toys "R" Us
Theater District, Manhattan